Hsieh Cheng-peng and Christopher Rungkat were the defending champions but chose to defend their title with different partners. Hsieh partnered Yang Tsung-hua and successfully defended his title. Rungkat partnered André Göransson but lost in the first round to Sadio Doumbia and Fabien Reboul.

Hsieh and Yang won the title after defeating Mikhail Elgin and Ramkumar Ramanathan 6–2, 7–5 in the final.

Seeds

Draw

References

External links
 Main draw

Shenzhen Longhua Open - Men's Doubles